Myeik Township is a township of Myeik District in the Taninthayi Division of Myanmar. The principal town is Myeik.

Demographics

2014

The 2014 Myanmar Census reported that Myeik Township had a population of 284,489. The population density was 200.6 people per km2. The census reported that the median age was 24.5 years, and a sex ratio of 96 males per 100 females. There were 54,349 households; the mean household size was 5.0.

References

 
Townships of Taninthayi Region